Gunslinger is a 1956 American Western film starring Beverly Garland as Rose Hood, the widow of a slain town marshal who inherits his job. Directed by Roger Corman from a screenplay by Mark Hanna and Charles B. Griffith, the film, shot in colour, also features Allison Hayes as Erica Page, the owner of a saloon, who hires a gunslinger assassin (John Ireland) to kill Rose.

The film began production in February 1956, as director Corman wanted to shoot one final film in six days before a change in union contracts meant that actors were limited to working only five days a week. Filming of Gunslinger was marred by several inconveniences; rain caused the filming location to become muddy, and the two lead actresses were both injured on set. Eventually, Gunslinger was released to mixed reviews, and, in 1993, was featured in a fifth-season episode of the film-mocking comedy television series Mystery Science Theater 3000.

Plot
After her husband Scott (William Schallert), the town marshal of Oracle, Texas, is killed by two assailants, his widow Rose (Beverly Garland), after shooting one of them, is named temporary marshal until the renowned Sam Bass arrives to permanently take the job. At the funeral, she spots and shoots the second killer. 

That night, Rose asks Erica Page (Allison Hayes) to close her saloon at 3 AM in accordance with town regulations, but Erica insists her saloon is open for business 24 hours. The women fight, but eventually Erica, who loses the fight, closes for the night. After Rose exits, Erica tells lackey Jake (Jonathan Haze) to hire a gunslinger, which he does, finding a man named Cane Miro (John Ireland). 

In Erica's saloon, Polk tells her that she has overextended herself by buying property along a proposed railroad track. She shows little concern for his warnings.

As Cane rides toward town, Rose shoots at him, mistaking him for a man, Nate Signo, she has been searching out. She apologizes. They then ride together and find Signo. When her back is turned, Signo makes suspicious movements, but Cane shoots him.

Cane enters Erica's saloon and confronts Polk until Erica requests he stop. Erica reveals that Rose is the woman whom she paid Cane to kill; however, if the proposed railroad track is a success, she admits that Rose may not have to die.

Erica buys a freight line from Zebulon Taub for $15,000, but has Jake follow him. Rose follows Cane as he exits town. When he stops to let her catch up, they talk and eventually kiss. Jake finds Taub, kills him, and steals the money back. Rose and Cane arrive on the scene afterwards; Jake sees them and reports to Erica, who becomes jealous and irate. She demands he kill Rose immediately. Cane reminds her that they cannot change the deal they made.

Cane tells Rose that he has come to Oracle to see town mayor Gideon Polk (Martin Kingsley), explaining that Polk had been his commander in an artillery battery at a battle which could have been a victory but that Polk panicked and ran, depressing his men, with those who didn't desert their positions being decimated, including Cane's four brothers, or captured like Cane himself. Rose makes Cane promise not to harm Polk, but still has Polk placed in protective custody.

Three of Erica's dance-hall girls whom Rose had ordered out of town due to their "immoral influence", ambush Rose on the road and try to hang her. However, Cane comes along and rescues her from the girls, who leave town. 

Cane becomes intoxicated. Erica enters his room, and Jake, who has been spying, sees the two kiss, but leaves before he sees Cane reject Erica. An embarrassed Erica orders Cane to kill Rose no matter what. When she returns to her saloon, Jake slaps her, and Erica says she'll kill him. Jake goes to Rose's office and tells her everything he knows. Back at the saloon, Jake draws a gun on Cane, who kills him. Rose does not arrest him as Erica claims it was self-defense.
 
After stealing a letter from an "Express Rider" (Dick Miller), informing her that the railroad will not be built, and killing him, Erica rides into town, intending to have Cane kill Rose. Deputy Joshua Tate (Chris Alcaide) is killed when he confronts them. Cane goes after Polk, killing his wife when she shields him. Cane then shoots and kills Polk. 

Rose enters town and Erica aims at her, but Erica is shot by Cane before she can pull the trigger. Rose pursues Cane out of town; they exchange fire. After he is shot, Cane asks if Rose loved him, and she replies that she did. Cane's wound is fatal, and Rose rides out of Oracle, declaring she will never come back. Sam Bass arrives just as she leaves, and asks her if the town is quiet: she affirms that it is.

Cast
Beverly Garland	... 	Marshal Rose Hood
John Ireland  ... 	Cane Miro
Allison Hayes 	... Erica Page
 Martin Kingsley 	... 	Mayor Gideon Polk
Jonathan Haze 	... 	Jake Hayes
 Margaret Campbell 	... Felicity Polk
Bruno VeSota 	... 	Zebelon Tabb 
Chris Alcaide 	... 	Deputy Joshua Tate
Dick Miller 	... 	Jimmy Tonto 
William Schallert 	... Marshal Scott Hood 
Kermit Maynard 	... Barfly

Production

Development

Gunslingers screenplay was written by Mark Hanna and Charles B. Griffith, from an idea by Corman, who proposed a Western film where a sheriff is murdered while on duty, and the sheriff's widow inherits the job. Griffith was hired when Jonathan Haze showed several of Griffith's screenplays to Corman, with Corman being impressed enough to hire him.

Griffith had written two Westerns for Corman which had not been made. "He took me out to see Three Hours to Kill [Alfred L. Werker, 1954] with Dana Andrews and said to me, 'I want you to do the same picture but with a woman as the sheriff'", said Griffith.

Corman later said, "I'm weary of prepackaged formulas, and when you try out a new idea, you necessarily think about shooting a hackneyed scene in a funny way without resorting to parody. This wasn't a parody, it was 'Good God, how can I find a different sort of gunslinger?' Right away, I thought of a woman gunslinger, and the idea for the script came to me all of a sudden. It was the sheriff's wife. He's killed and she takes over for her husband. It was logical when it wasn't, but that was enough for a six-or seven-day western."

It was originally known as The Yellow Rose of Texas.

Filming
Gunslinger began production on 22 January  1956, as the International Alliance of Theatrical Stage Employees and the film studios renegotiated for a five-day work week instead of six. Director Roger Corman decided to film a low-budget Western in six days before the new contract took effect, with Gene Corman providing half of the financing. Shot at the Jack Ingram Western Movie Ranch in Topanga, California, it rained for five days during the shoot. Corman had to go over schedule, taking seven days instead of six, which he recounted as the only time he had ever done so. The rain made the area muddy, causing trucks, cameras, and lighting equipment to sink. When the crew left the set, Corman did not hire a guard, telling the film's assistant director that "anyone who'd come out here, steal the equipment, and carry it through this mud is welcome to get it."

Due to the quick shooting schedule, the rain forced several exterior scenes to be re-written to be shot inside. Other scenes were shot with a large tarp draped over the actors. Due to the fact that the rainfall was audible in the background, Corman used the film's score and an assortment of sound effects to drown out the noise. The first scene shot was Beverly Garland and John Ireland's love scene in a tree. The tree was home to a colony of red ants, who crawled all over the actors and repeatedly bit them.

Actors were injured several times on set. One day, Allison Hayes' horse slipped in the mud, causing her to fall off. Hayes broke her arm. While the crew waited for an ambulance to arrive, Corman shot a reel of close-ups of Hayes looking left and right, with the intent of splicing them in to the final cut while using a double to shoot other scenes. When shooting wrapped, the crew all signed Hayes' orthopedic cast.

In another instance, a scene called for Garland to exit the saloon, jump on a horse, and ride out of town. When the scene was shot, Garland jumped over the horse instead of on it, so the scene had to be shot again. During the second take, she twisted her ankle running down the stairs in the saloon, but continued the scene. When Garland returned home, she thought it would feel good to put her ankle in a warm bath and did. She left it there for about an hour, but when she took it out, she found that it had swollen to twice its normal size. When she returned to the set, Corman said, "Well, we have to start shooting." In order to fit her ankle into her boot, the crew cut the back of it and taped it to her foot. Garland was unable to walk for nearly a week after Gunslinger finished shooting, writing that "I had screwed up my ankle so bad!"

While Corman described the production of Gunslinger as "one of the worst experiences of my life" and Hayes wanted to leave the film during shooting, Garland considered Rose Hood one of her favorite roles, noting that:
I think I was the first woman to play a marshal in a movie western. Roger would often cast against type in those days. I could never resist a plum role like a lady marshal in a genre that would never have considered such a gender reversal like that before. However, working with Roger was always an adventure and this film was no exception.
Corman later said
My Texas distributor arrived in the city where I was filming and asked me how it was going. I told him that I thought that it was good but that there was too much violence and passion, and he answered, "Roger, I’ve been in this business for forty years, and you’ve been in it for just two. Let me tell you that no one has ever made a film with too much passion and violence." So I pressed on. Everyone was dying. At the end of the film half of the city was dead.

Release

Reception
Released in October 1956, Gunslinger has received mixed reviews from critics.

The Hollywood Reporter called it "quite a startling Western" and praised the two lead actresses, saying "Miss Garland and Hayes are good as the feuding ladies from different sides of the tracks."

Variety wrote that "with such a twist to the conventional western plot, this Roger Corman production should get its share of playing time attention in the program market."

VideoHound's Golden Movie Retriever praised Gunslinger for being a "unique western with a surprise ending." In The Encyclopedia of Western Movies, Gunslinger was praised for exploring the potential of a woman gunfighter, and that it was "the most assured of Corman's quartet of Westerns." In his book Western Movies: A Guide to 5,105 Feature Films, Michael R. Pitts said that it was an "early six day Roger Corman cheapie that is rather appealing."

Adversely, Bill Gibron, writing for DVD Verdict, gave Gunslinger a negative review, writing, "Roger Corman was responsible for a lot of smoldering cinematic cowflops over the course of his economically sound career, but Gunslinger has got to be one of the most overripe and ridiculous." While he stated that "Beverly Garland, who plays our dispassionate Rose, and John Ireland, as the cool and callous Cane Myro, are decent enough", he wrote that "there isn't much to recommend in this movie", saying that "there's too much unresolved intrigue, too many easy answers to rotten questions, to make heads or tails of what is supposed to matter." TV Guide gave Gunslinger two stars, and said that "it's a strange little Corman film, made before he went wholeheartedly for horror films, and this too has a semi-sense of the strange." Film reviewer Leonard Maltin gave Gunslinger one star and a half.

Home media
Gunslinger was released on DVD by Optimum Home Entertainment on September 15, 2008, as part of Roger Corman: The Collection, which included five other Corman-directed films: Five Guns West, The Haunted Palace, The Premature Burial, The Masque of Red Death and Wild Angels. The Mystery Science Theater 3000 episode featuring Gunslinger has been released twice: once as part of Rhino Home Video's Mystery Science Theater 3000 Collection, Volume 6 which included three other episodes from the series, and once by Shout! Factory as a standalone disc.

In popular culture
Gunslinger was featured in a fifth-season episode of Mystery Science Theater 3000, a comedy television series. The show features a human and his robot creations watching bad films while providing a running commentary which mocks it. Gunslinger was the eleventh episode of the fifth season, which was broadcast on Comedy Central on October 9, 1993. Gunslinger was the penultimate episode for series creator and host Joel Hodgson, who left the show at the end of the next episode, Mitchell.

Actor and writer Kevin Murphy, who provides the voice and puppetry of Tom Servo in the series, spoke disparagingly about the film in the book Mystery Science Theater 3000: The Amazing Colossal Episode Guide, writing, "One of my darkest fears is that I'll one day make my own film, my story, my direction, my own crystalline vision of something so universal, it must needs be shared with the world on the silver screen. And I make the movie, and it turns out like Gunslinger, or any other Corman film—turgid, insipid, clichéd, confusing, every opportunity for artistic expression intentionally ignored."

References

Bibliography

External links
 
Gunslinger at Letterbox DVD
Roger Corman on Gunslinger at Trailers from Hell

1956 films
Films directed by Roger Corman
1956 Western (genre) films
Films produced by Roger Corman
Films with screenplays by Charles B. Griffith
Films scored by Ronald Stein
Films set in Texas
American Western (genre) films
Films shot in California
1950s English-language films
Revisionist Western (genre) films
1950s American films